Ficus triloba is an Asian species of fig tree in the family Moraceae. It is dioecious, with male and female flowers produced on separate individuals.

Nomenclature
This species is similar to Ficus simplicissima and synonyms include: F. simplicissima var. roxburghii, F. esquiroliana and F. hirta var. roxburghii; its native range is Sikkim to S. China, Indo-China and Sumatra.  Note: the Global Biodiversity Information Facility lists this as a synonym of F. triloba Buch.-Ham. ex Wall.

References

External links 
 

triloba
Trees of Vietnam
Flora of Indo-China
Flora of Malesia
Plants described in 1805
Plants described in 1790
Dioecious plants